The Vancouver Southsiders is an independent supporters group for Vancouver Whitecaps FC of Major League Soccer. The group was created in 1999 by soccer fans from Vancouver and its greater metropolitan area to support the former Vancouver Whitecaps FC of the D2 Pro League. The name of the group alludes to the south side of Swangard Stadium, where the supporters first started to congregate.

History

The group began in 1999 when fans of the Vancouver 86ers began congregating in the pitch-level beer garden behind the goal at the south end of Swangard Stadium. They originally called themselves "The Carlsberg Crew" in reference to the sponsor of Swangard's beer garden, Carlsberg Beer. The following season, the group renamed itself as the "Canterbury Chorus" following an off-season change to the team's beer sponsor. The group was finally renamed to "The Southsiders" to avoid the need to change names every time the sponsor changed.

In 2004, the Southsiders worked with the supporters' groups of Portland and Seattle to establish the Cascadia Cup. The cup is awarded to the team that does the best in the season series between the three in the Pacific Northwest. John Knox, then president of the Southsiders, said that the Cup is "hugely important".

The Southsiders' relationship with team ownership has not always been positive. In 2003, the Southsiders felt marginalized by the front office and began depositing empty beer cups onto the field. The relationship improved as a dialog was opened. The front office and group continued to benefit from each other when Vancouver received an MLS expansion team. Images of the Southsiders are featured prominently in Whitecaps' marketing campaigns. The group's board was invited to the invite-only launch of the Whitecaps' MLS kits and logo.

The Whitecaps' expansion into MLS has also led to an increase in membership; it had grown from about 40 paying members to 100 in July 2010. At the group's annual general meeting, held in December 2010, paid membership was tabulated at just shy of 200 members. Just a year later, the membership base was over 700 strong. John Knox, the previous president of the Southsiders, believes there is no reason why the Southsiders cannot outdo the Seattle Sounders' Emerald City Supporters.

Now that the Whitecaps are playing at BC Place stadium, the Southsiders can be found in the southeast corner (sections 249–254).

Culture
The Southsiders originated as a group of fans that enjoyed a European-style experience over the traditional family-friendly atmosphere during matches. They have been described as a "rabid supporters group".

Along with adding colour and atmosphere, the group sings various chants during matches. Their theme song is titled "Boundary Road" sung to the tune of John Denver's "Take Me Home, Country Roads", it references Swangard Stadium's location on Boundary Road in Burnaby, British Columbia. The Southsiders' version is as follows:
Boundary Road, take me home,
To the place where I belong.
Vancouver, pretty mama,
Take me home, Boundary road.

References

External links

 Vancouver Southsiders Experience
 Vancouver Southsiders Flickr
 RedNation.ca Vancouver Southsiders Documentary

Vancouver Whitecaps
Major League Soccer fan clubs
1999 establishments in British Columbia